Ovilikanda is a small town in Sri Lanka. It is located within Central Province.

See also
List of towns in Central Province, Sri Lanka

External links

Populated places in Southern Province, Sri Lanka
Populated places in Matale District